Khovansky, Khovanski or Khovanskiy is a Russian masculine surname, its feminine counterpart is Khovanskaya or Khovanskaia. It may refer to:
Aleksey Khovansky (fencer) (born 1987), Russian foil fencer
Aleksey Khovansky (publisher) (1814–1899), Russian philologist and publisher
Ivan Khovansky (disambiguation), several people
Sergey Khovanskiy (born 1977), Russian sprint canoer
Vyacheslav Khovanskiy (born 1968), Russian association football player
Yury Khovansky (born 1990), Russian video blogger